Ayeyeiknyein Cemetery (also spelt Aye Yeik Nyein Cemetery), commonly known as the Kyanikan Cemetery is a publicly owned cemetery and crematorium in Mandalay Region, Myanmar. It is operated by the Mandalay City Development Committee (MCDC).

The final rites of the Shwegyin Nikaya Thathanabaing Manitasiri were held at the cemetery in June 2018.

References

Cemeteries in Myanmar